was a Japanese girl group associated with Hello! Project. The group was created to promote Morning Musume's production of Rodgers and Hammerstein's Cinderella, titled . Their sound is said to have an R&B feel.

History
The group's debut single, was released on June 11, 2008, under the Zetima label in two versions. The regular version contains the CD-single only, while the limited version contains a bonus DVD. The Single V was also released for the song two weeks later, on June 25, 2008.

High-King returned in 2009 along with other shuffle units, releasing two new songs to compilations in 2009, "Diamonds", a cover song and a new original song later in 2009 called "DESTINY LOVE".

High-King ceased activities in September 2011 when Ai Takahashi graduated Morning Musume and Hello! Project, effectively graduating from High-King as well.

In 2013, High-King briefly returned to perform "C/C (Cinderella Complex)" as Ai Takahashi with High-King, making High-King officially a three-member unit with Reina, Saki and Maimi.

In 2015, Saki Shimizu and Maimi Yajima briefly performed during Berryz Kobo Matsuri on February 28 and March 1 as High-King, performing the song "Koiku no Meiro".

Members 
 Reina Tanaka (Leader of High King and member of Morning Musume) (graduated May 2013)
 Ai Takahashi (Leader of Morning Musume) (graduated September 2011)
 Saki Shimizu (Leader of Berryz Kobo)
 Maimi Yajima (Leader of Cute)
 Yuuka Maeda  (Member of Hello! Pro Egg, and after S/mileage member) (graduated December 2011)

Discography

Singles

Other Songs

2009:

"Diamonds" (Chanpuru 1 ~Happy Marriage Song Cover Shuu~)
"DESTINY LOVE" (Petit Best 10)

2010:

"Daite yo! PLEASE GO ON" (Hello! Project 2010 Summer ~Fankora~)

2011:

"Scramble" (Hello! Project 2011 Winter ~Kangei Shinsen Matsuri~ A gana Live)
"SHALL WE LOVE?" (Hello! Project 2011 Winter ~Kangei Shinsen Matsuri~ A gana Live)

References

External links 
 Official Hello! Project discography 

Musical groups established in 2008
Japanese girl groups
Japanese idol groups
Japanese pop music groups
Hello! Project groups
Musical groups from Tokyo